Keif al-Hal?  (How are You?) is Saudi Arabia's first big-budget film, produced by Ayman Halawani (of Prince Al-Walid bin Talal's Rotana Group). Directed by Izidore Musallam, it stars Hind Mohammed, the first Saudi cinema actress.

Plot
The film is a comedy-drama that recounts the story of a family torn between modernity and tradition in Saudi Arabia.

Production
The film, shot in Dubai, United Arab Emirates is financed by Rotana Group, a company owned by Saudi billionaire Prince Alwaleed bin Talal.

Release and reception
Saudi audiences were able to see the film on pay-per-view through an agreement with Showtime Arabia.  The movie was shown at 17 festivals worldwide.

References

Further reading

External links

 CNN video: news report by Schams Elwazer
 BBC: 'First' Saudi feature film aims high
 Al-Jazeera: Review of the film
 Washington Post: Review and interview
 

2006 films
Censorship in Saudi Arabia
2006 comedy-drama films
Films shot in Dubai
Films set in Saudi Arabia
Saudi Arabian comedy-drama films